Vero Copner Wynne-Edwards, CBE, FRS, FRSE (4 July 1906 – 5 January 1997) was an English zoologist. He was best known for his advocacy of group selection, the theory that natural selection acts at the level of the group.

Life
He was born in Leeds on 4 July 1906 the son of Rev Canon John Rosindale Wynne-Edwards and his wife, Lilian Agnes Streatfield. He attended Rugby School then studied Zoology at Oxford University graduating MA. In 1929 he took a post at McGill University in Canada, lecturing in zoology. This was interrupted by the Second World War during which he served in the Royal Canadian Naval Reserve. After the war Aberdeen University made him the Regius Professor in Natural History and he continued this until retiral in 1974.

He was elected a Fellow of the Royal Society of Edinburgh in 1950. His proposers were Cyril Edward Lucas, Sir Maurice Yonge, Charles W Parsons and Dr John Berry. He won the Society's Neill Prize for the period 1973–75. He was made a Commander of the Order of the British Empire in 1974 and was given an honorary doctorate (LLD) by Aberdeen University.

He remained in the area after retiral and died in Banchory on 5 January 1997.

Advocacy of group selection

Wynne-Edwards was best known for espousing a form of group selection that operates at the level of the species, most notably in his 1962 book, Animal Dispersion in Relation to Social Behaviour.  In it, he argued that many behaviors evolved for the good of the species as a whole, rather than at a lower level of organization. For example, he argued that species have adaptive population-regulatory mechanisms. His arguments were vigorously criticized by George C. Williams in his Adaptation and Natural Selection, a debate summarized by Richard Dawkins in The Selfish Gene. David Sloan Wilson and E. O. Wilson called Wynne-Edwards' theory "naive group selection".

Among the mechanisms that Wynne-Edwards proposed was population regulation, based on the communication of population density by what he called epideictic displays, in which individuals advertised their genitals. If a population was becoming too dense, such displays would result in reduced breeding across the population, contrary to Darwinian natural selection but in line with Wynne-Edwards's group selection. The mechanism has never been demonstrated unequivocally.

Fellow of the Royal Society
In 1970 he was elected a Fellow of the Royal Society. His candidature citation read

"Wynne-Edwards is noted for his many contributions to ecology. His early work was on social and other forms of rhythmic behaviour in birds. Later work on North Atlantic birds disclosed the existence of inshore, offshore and pelagic zones, each with a characteristic avian fauna. These categories have been found to apply generally to all oceans, and have been adopted as standard by later authors. His most important work has been on population dynamics in relation to social behaviour. It provides an hypothesis of homeostatic control of population density in animals at an optimum level, with a primary and universal function of sociality. Wynne-Edwards directs two research teams devoted to this work. He has also published papers on the animals and plants of the Arctic."

Family
He married Jeannie Morris in 1929.

Their son Hugh Wynne-Edwards is a professor of geology, and his granddaughter Katherine Wynne-Edwards is a professor of biology at the University of Calgary.

Books
 Wynne-Edwards, V.C. 1962. Animal Dispersion in Relation to Social Behavior. Oliver & Boyd, London.

References

Bibliography

Adaptation and Natural Selection (1966) Princeton University Press, Princeton, N.J.
Group Selection(1971) Aldine·Atherton, Chicago, IL.

Further reading

External links
 http://elibrary.unm.edu/sora/Auk/v116n03/p0815-p0816.pdf 
 https://web.archive.org/web/20050527025636/http://people.bu.edu/cschneid/BI504/PowerPoint/Week5_2.pdf
 Vero Wynne-Edwards fonds at Queen's University Archives
 http://www.royalsoced.org.uk/fellowship/obits/obits_alpha/wynne-edwards_vero.pdf 
 http://www.wku.edu/~smithch/chronob/WYNN1906.htm
 https://www.nytimes.com/1997/02/08/world/vero-wynne-edwards-90-evolution-theorist.html
 http://findarticles.com/p/articles/mi_qa3793/is_199907/ai_n8874242/
 http://www.hbi.ucalgary.ca/profiles/dr-katherine-e-wynne-edwards

1906 births
1997 deaths
Military personnel from Leeds
Royal Canadian Navy personnel of World War II
Royal Canadian Navy personnel
People from Leeds
People educated at Rugby School
Alumni of New College, Oxford
Commanders of the Order of the British Empire
English biologists
Fellows of the Royal Society
Fellows of the Royal Society of Edinburgh
Academics of the University of Aberdeen
Academics of the University of Bristol
Academic staff of McGill University
Scientists from Yorkshire
20th-century biologists